William Bowerman (died c. 1590) of Wells, Somerset, was an English politician.

Family
Bowerman married Elizabeth Longe, a widow. They had one son and one daughter.

Career
He was a Member (MP) of the Parliament of England for Wells in 1572.

References

Year of birth missing
1590 deaths
English MPs 1572–1583
People from Wells, Somerset
16th-century births